Bertha (Anna Barbara) Zück, also called Babette (2 February 1797 – 20 February 1868 at Stockholm Palace), was the German favourite, Lady's maid and treasurer of Queen Josephine of Sweden.

Bertha Zück arrived to Sweden from Bavaria in the entourage of  Josephine of Leuchtenberg at her wedding with the Crown Prince of Sweden in 1823. Josephine became Queen in 1844. 

Zück was, alongside Josephine’s Catholic confessor, Lorentz Studach (d. 1873), Josephine's most intimate friend and favourite: Zück, Studach and Josephine was so close that they were referred to at the royal court as ”The Trio”. Originally employed as a lady's maid, Bertha Zück was later appointed to the post of the Queen's treasurer, an unusual post for a woman in the 19th century.

See also 
 Emerentia von Düben

References

 Lars Elgklou: Bernadotte. Historien - eller historier - om en familj., Askild & Kärnekull Förlag AB, Stockholm 1978. .

1797 births
1868 deaths
Treasurers
19th-century Swedish people
Royal favourites
Swedish courtiers
Swedish royal favourites